The governor of Abra is the local chief executive of the Philippine province of Abra.

References

 
Politics of Abra (province)
Governors of provinces of the Philippines